The 1979 Cincinnati Bengals season was the franchise's 10th season in the National Football League, and the 12th overall. Fullback Pete Johnson powered his way to 15 touchdowns, but the Bengals struggled to their second straight 4–12 record. After the season, former Cleveland coach Forrest Gregg was named to replace Homer Rice as Bengals head coach.

Offseason

NFL draft

Personnel

Staff

Roster

Regular season

Schedule

Standings

References

External links 
 1979 Cincinnati Bengals at Pro-Football-Reference.com

Cincinnati Bengals
Cincinnati Bengals seasons
Cinc